Mikhmoret (lit. Fishing net) is a moshav in central Israel. Located on the coast of the Mediterranean Sea around nine kilometres north of Netanya, it falls under the jurisdiction of Hefer Valley Regional Council.

History

The moshav was founded in 1945 by demobilised soldiers from the British Army, and was named Mikhmoret due to the profession of many of the founders being fishers.

The moshav expanded onto lands of the depopulated Palestinian village of 'Arab al-Nufay'at, whose inhabitants were expelled by an order issued by the Haganah from 10 April 1948.

In 2012 Mikhmoret Beach was listed as one of the best beaches in Israel.

The Israel Nature and Parks Authority established the Sea Turtle Rescue and Rehabilitation Center in Moshav Mikhmoret.

Notable residents
 Amit Inbar (born 1972), Olympic competitive windsurfer, and kitesurfer
 Moti Kirschenbaum (born 1939), media personality
 Lee Korzits (born 1984), Olympic and 4-time world champion windsurfer
 Nimrod Mashiah (born 1988), windsurfer
 Avraham Tal (born 1976), Judge in the 4th season of The Voice ישראל.

References

Moshavim
Populated places established in 1945
Populated places in Central District (Israel)
1945 establishments in Mandatory Palestine